Olujić is a surname found in Serbia and Croatia. Notable people with the surname include:

Grozdana Olujić (1934–2019), Serbian writer, translator, editor, and critic
Krunoslav Olujić (born 1952), Croatian attorney
Tatjana Olujić, Serbian violinist and university professor

Serbian surnames
Croatian surnames